Antonio "Toni" Segura González (born 31 March 1998) is a Spanish footballer who plays as an attacking midfielder.

Club career
Toni was born in Las Palmas, Canary Islands, and joined Real Betis' youth setup in July 2012, from UD Las Palmas. Promoted to the reserves ahead of the 2015–16 season, he made his senior debut on 30 August 2015 by coming on as a second-half substitute for Julio Gracia in a 0–1 home loss against La Hoya Lorca CF.

Toni scored his first senior goal on 6 September 2015, netting the winner in a 4–3 home defeat of FC Jumilla. He finished the campaign with one goal in 15 appearances, as his side suffered relegation.

On 20 July 2016, Toni moved to Real Madrid and returned to youth football. He was promoted to the B-team in June of the following year, but only appeared sparingly before being loaned to fellow third division side Recreativo de Huelva on 20 January 2018.

On 8 August 2018, Toni terminated his contract with Los Blancos, and signed for another reserve team, UD Las Palmas Atlético two days later. He made his first team debut on 14 April 2019, replacing Deivid in a 0–3 home loss against Cádiz CF.

On 3 February 2020, Toni joined the Polish club Legia Warsaw to play for their reserve team. The Polish club confirmed on 8 July 2020 that Toni was to leave the club. Toni then returned to Spain and signed with UD Tamaraceite on 17 October 2020.

Personal life
Toni's father, also named Antonio, was also a footballer and a midfielder. He also represented Las Palmas.

References

External links
Real Madrid profile

1998 births
Living people
Footballers from Las Palmas
Spanish footballers
Spanish expatriate footballers
Association football midfielders
Segunda División players
Segunda División B players
Betis Deportivo Balompié footballers
Real Madrid Castilla footballers
Recreativo de Huelva players
UD Las Palmas Atlético players
UD Las Palmas players
UD Tamaraceite footballers
Legia Warsaw players
Arka Gdynia players
II liga players
III liga players
Spain youth international footballers
Spanish expatriate sportspeople in Poland
Expatriate footballers in Poland